Gnostikoi Ha-Shaitan is the first studio album by Finnish black metal band Saturnian Mist. It was recorded at three locations, Watercastle Studios, Desolate Star Studios and Ordo Templi Keliokis, during December 2010 - February 2011.

The title is combination of Hebrew and Ancient Greek and it loosely translates: "Those who are able to know the adversity". According to Metal Rules interview of the band's vocalist Zetekh "Adversity" refers here to an archetype of the Devil and "Gnostikoi" means "Those who are able to know", derivative from the works of Plato and the term Gnosis.

A music video was made from the album, from the track ”Aura Mystica” which was also serving as a directorial debut of Zetekh.

Track listing
All lyrics written by fra. Zetekh except "Bythos In Quintessence" by le Sorcier and "The Watcher's Feast" by Johannes Nefastos. All music written by Saturnian Mist

Personnel

 Saturnian Mist
 Zetekh - Lead & backing vocals
 Chaoswind - Lead guitars
 Shu-Ananda - Rhythm & solo guitar, clean vocals
 Ptahaz - Bass guitar
 Wyrmfang - Drums

 Guest writers
 Johannes Nefastos (Lyrics for "The Watcher's Feast")
 le Sorcier (Lyrics for "Bythos In Quintessence")

 Production
 H. Kivelä - Mixing, photography
 Zetekh - Producing, graphic illustrations and layouts
 Shu-Ananda - Producing
 Vesa-Antti Puumalainen - Cover art
 neuroscan.org - Mastering

References

External links

 Official website

2011 debut albums
Saturnian Mist albums